Tilted Towers can refer to:
 Tilted Towers, a location in the video game Fortnite Battle Royale
 "Tilted Towers" (song), a 2018 single by Swedish DJ Alesso

See also
 List of leaning towers, a list of towers which are tilted